Davyhulme was a parliamentary constituency in the Davyhulme suburb of Greater Manchester.  It elected conservative Winston Spencer-Churchill, grandson of Prime Minister Sir Winston Churchill, as a Member of Parliament of the House of Commons of the Parliament of the United Kingdom from its establishment for the 1983 general election until it was abolished for the 1997 general election.

Upon the constituency's abolition, the territory it covered was mostly incorporated into the new Stretford and Urmston constituency, with the Sale areas joining the new Wythenshawe and Sale East and Altrincham and Sale West constituencies.

History
The constituency only existed for three elections spanning nine years; having been established for the 1983 general election and abolished by the 1997 general election. In that time, the constituency elected Churchill every election. National results released by the BBC and ITN ahead of the 1983 election estimated that had the constituency existed at the 1979 general election it would have been won by the Conservatives with a majority of 10,671 votes.

Boundaries
1983–1997: The Metropolitan Borough of Trafford wards of Bucklow, Davyhulme East, Davyhulme West, Flixton, Mersey St Mary's, Priory, St Martin's, and Urmston.

Members of Parliament

Elections

Elections in the 1990s

Elections in the 1980s

Notes and references

Parliamentary constituencies in North West England (historic)
Constituencies of the Parliament of the United Kingdom established in 1983
Constituencies of the Parliament of the United Kingdom disestablished in 1997
Trafford